Children of the Sea or Kinderen Der Zee is an 1872 oil-on-canvas painting by Dutch artist Jozef Israëls. The painting is a depiction of peasant children playing in the ocean.

History
Israëls first painted the subject of Children of the Sea in 1863. The subject was popular and Israëls repeated it in other paintings. Many of his paintings show peasants at work or resting. Children of the Sea portrays children at play, and the toy is a sailing boat in the shallow water. In Dutch the painting is known as Kinderen Der Zee. The painting is now in the collections of the Rijksmuseum in Amsterdam. 

Israëls created at least 13 different versions or configurations of children playing by the sea. While documenting the lives and struggles of fishermen he took time to document the joy and innocence of children at play.

Description
Children of a fisherman play in the ocean wearing their working class clothing, and a toy boat floats in front of them. There are four children; the largest is a boy who carries a younger child on his back.

Reception
The painting appears on the cover of the 2021 book Aus Meinen Kindertagen by Selma Lagerlöf. Another version appears on the cover of Edith Nesbit's 2022 fantasy fiction novel Wet Magic.

References

1872 paintings
Paintings of children
Bathing in art
Ships in art
Paintings in the collection of the Rijksmuseum
Paintings by Jozef Israëls